Paul Bown (born 11 October 1957) is an English actor.

Acting career
Bown is best known for playing a leading role in the Granada Television sitcom Watching (1987–1993) and Casualty in 2000 more recently as Philip Reid in BBC's Holby City.

He starred as an AA Patrolman in the television series by the BBC, The Last Salute at the end of the 1990s. Bown also appeared in November 2007, in acclaimed British drama Britz. He appeared in the first episode of Mr. Bean as "The Student". He was in an episode of New Tricks on 25 August 2008.

In 2009, he appeared briefly as Mike Bamber, chairman of Brighton and Hove Albion Football Club, in the Brian Clough bio pic The Damned United. In the 2010 Christmas Special of My Family, he played the grandfather of a young girl who Ben meets whilst filling in for Father Christmas. Bown appeared in an advert for Toffee Crisp in the 1980s. Paul played Vladimir Ivanov in Heartbeat in 1994 and John Boaden in 2005.

In 2016, he appeared in the television series by the BBC, Father Brown as Mordaunt Jackson in "The Sins of the Father" episode. In 2017, he appeared in the television series by ITV, Endeavour as Rev Mervyn Golightly.

In 2019, Bown appeared in episode 4 of the ITV drama A Confession, alongside Martin Freeman and Joe Absolom. Bown played the ex-cellmate of serial killer Christopher Halliwell.

In 2019 he appeared in Coronation Street as the brother of Roy Cropper, while in 2020 he appeared as Michael Connors in series 2 of the ITV drama Bancroft.

In 2022 he appeared in Death in Paradise as UK chess champion Maurice Holburne.

Personal life
Bown is married to the makeup artist, Jane Jamieson. The couple have four children together.

Filmography

Film

Television

External links

1957 births
English male television actors
Living people
People from Fenton, Staffordshire